Skeletophyllon dictyograpta is a moth in the family Cossidae. It was described by Roepke in 1957. It is found on Borneo and Java. The habitat consists of lowland mangrove forests, swamp forests and dry heath forests.

References

Natural History Museum Lepidoptera generic names catalog

Zeuzerinae
Moths described in 1957